The Afghanistan cricket team toured the United Arab Emirates to play Hong Kong in November 2015. The tour consisted of a Twenty20 International (T20I) match and was in preparation for the 2016 Asia Cup Qualifier. Hong Kong won the one-off match by 4 wickets.

Squads

Only T20I

References

External links
 Series home at ESPNcricinfo

2015 in Afghan cricket
2015 in Hong Kong cricket
International cricket competitions in 2015–16
Afghan cricket tours of the United Arab Emirates
Hong Kong cricket tours of the United Arab Emirates
2015 in Emirati cricket